Edward Mulcahy may refer to:

 Edward Mulcahy (State Department official), deputy to Assistant United States Secretary of State Nathaniel Davis
 Edward Mulcahy (politician) (1850–1927), Irish-born Australian politician in Tasmania
 Edward W. Mulcahy (1921–2006), American diplomat and ambassador